Dorino is an Italian male given name.

People with this given name include:

 Dorino Gattilusio, several members of the Genovesi Byzantine noble family Gattilusi
 Dorino I Gattilusio (died 1455) Lord of Lesbos
 Dorino II Gattilusio (died 1488) Lord of Ainos, Samothrace and Imbros
 Dorino Serafini (1909–2000) Italian motorcycle racer and racecar driver
 Dorino Della Valle (20th century) father of Italian businessman Diego Della Valle
 Dorino Vanzo (born 1950) Italian race cyclist

See also
 Dorina (given name)
 Dora (given name)